Cyclonic Storm Sitrang was a weak tropical cyclone that affected India and Bangladesh in late October 2022. It was the first cyclone to make landfall Bangladesh since Cyclone Mora in 2017. Formed on 22 October offshore Andaman and Nicobar Islands, it gradually intensified and peaked as a high-end cyclonic storm before making landfall over Bangladesh close to Barisal by the early hours of 25 October.

Meteorological history

Sitrang originated from an area of ​​low pressure near the Bay of Bengal offshore the Andaman and Nicobar Islands on 17 October. During its existence, the IMD designated as "high" the possibility of this low-pressure area turning into depression, according to its first bulletin. Days later, when it was in warm waters and with little wind shear, the IMD classified it as a depression, being called BOB 09, according to the third bulletin. Immediately the JTWC issued a TCFA on the system by 15:00 UTC of 22 October. Hours later, BOB 09 gained momentum and in the agency's fifth bulletin, it was reported that it had turned into a deep depression. On 23 October, the cyclone gained more strength and reached the status of a cyclonic storm, being called Sitrang by the India Meteorological Department which was contributed by Thailand. By 09:00 UTC of 23 October, the JTWC designated the storm as Tropical Storm 05B. As it was predicted to make landfall over Bangladesh, there was a prediction that Sitrang would turn into a severe cyclonic storm, but it did not materialize because of increase in dry air. When it made landfall over Bangladesh close to Patuakhali in Barisal on the early hours of 25 October (local time), the cyclone began to lose strength and was downgraded to a deep Depression. The JTWC issued final warning on the system by 21:00 UTC of October 25. Afterwards, Sitrang continued to weaken and in its thirteenth and final bulletin, IMD declared that the cyclone was downgraded to a low pressure area by 06:00 UTC of 25 October. It dissipated over Northeast India by the same night.

Preparation and impact
Sitrang caused the evacuation of about a million people, resulting in at least 35 deaths and damaging over 20,000 homes in Bangladesh. Flooding and heavy rains were brought on by the cyclone in numerous regions, including the capital Dhaka. Over 8 million people lost power. In Tripura, the pandals of Kali Puja were severely damaged due to heavy wind and rains. The government reported the agricultural loss of Tk3.5 billion (US$34.4 million).

Aftermath
The Bangladeshi authorities evacuated thousands of people to shelters as the cyclone moved northward from the Bay of Bengal and approached Bangladesh's extensive coastline. The government also requested fishing boats to return from the deep sea and remain anchored in the Bay of Bengal, closed three airports, and stopped all river transportation operations throughout the nation.

See also

 Weather of 2022
 Tropical cyclones in 2022
 2022 North Indian Ocean cyclone season
 Cyclone Viyaru
 Cyclone Amphan A extremely powerful tropical cyclone that affected Bangladesh in 2020
 Cyclone Sidr

References

2022 in Bangladesh
2022 disasters in Asia
October 2022 events in Asia
Sitrang
Sitrang
Sitrang
Sitrang
Tropical cyclones in India
2022 meteorology
2022 disasters in India